Carolina Castillo may refer to:

 Carolina Ruiz Castillo (born 1981), Spanish skier
 Carolina Castillo (wrestler) (born 1990), Colombian freestyle wrestler